Volk ans Gewehr (People to Arms) was the refrain of the very popular 1931 Nazi song "Siehst du im Osten das Morgenrot" (Do you see dawn in the east). The song was written by Arno Pardun, who dedicated it to Joseph Goebbels. It contains strong allusions to the well-known workers' song Brothers, to the sun, to freedom, a German communist song later adopted by the NSDAP.

The song, which was characterized by a hammering march rhythm, was first heard at a rally in the Berlin Sports Palace on 8 January 1932 by about 150 Sturmabteilung (SA) people of Standard 7 and performed publicly by the Fuhsel Chapel. In the following years, it became one of the most played National Socialist songs. 

Pardun's song was one of the most famous mass songs of the Nazi era; in the 1930s, it was mainly used as an SA marching song. It was also a compulsory song for the Reichsarbeitsdienst. During  World War II, it was used as a military song - not least because it was included in the soldier's song book Morgen marschieren wir (Tomorrow we march). The song was used as the interval signal of Reichssender Berlin. In 1944, the song was again opted for use by the Volkssturm.

The decisive bars of the song were used shortly after the Nazi seizure of power by the Berlin radio station. Lectures at German universities or student council meetings also started with the song after 1933. Thus, people were constantly reminded of this song. The historian Jutta Sywottek describes this as a subtle educational tool of the National Socialists for propaganda and preparation for war. 

At the Nuremberg trials of the major German war criminals, this song was used as evidence.

Text and Melody 

The text contains allusions to numerous cornerstones of Nazi ideology, such as the demand for the creation of living space in the east (“Do you see the dawn in the east”), sharp anti-Jewish sentiment (“Germany awake and death to the Jews”) and the invocation of the entire people to aid the war effort ("People to arms, people to arms!"), as well as the popular workers' song Brothers, to the sun, to freedom, for example in the first line.

The slogan People to arms goes back to a poem from 1820 ("Freedom, your tree is rotting/everyone on the begging stick/soon bites into the hunger grave/people's rifle"). The melody has a minor character, fifth and fourth structures, as well as echoes of church modes of the 19th century song type. The song was "exposed to the accusation of being un-German, Russian or Bolshevik". Above all, the power of the chorus line gives the battle song its effect.

The famous Swedish politician Sven-Olof Lindholm wrote the song Folk i gevär in 1936 to the original melody. At the same time, the Swedish version of the song is not a translation of the German one: its text consists of three verses, does not contain references to any ideologies or personalities, and does not call for the destruction of anyone.

Legal position 
The performance of this song in public is prohibited in Germany according to Section 86a of the Criminal Code. In Austria, comparable provisions apply due to Section 3 of the Prohibition Act of 1947.

References 

Nazi songs
German patriotic songs
Political songs